Alfred Emuejeraye (born 13 January 1983) is a Nigerian footballer.

Club career 
Emuejeraye started his career at Julius Berger, and played there until 2003. He joined Grasshopper Club Zürich in 2003 and then returned to Julius Berger. He moved to Singapore to play the 2006–07 season for Gombak United but returned to Switzerland to play the 2007–08 season for SR Delémont. After trials at Serbian side FK Partizan, where he played in two friendly games and scored one goal, he was signed by FC Wohlen on 18 August 2008 and played with them in the 2008–09 season.

Emuejeraye moved to China and joined Tianjin Teda on 28 February 2010. He made 7 appearances and scored once at the 2010 Chinese Super League but was released in June of that year due to contractual disputes. He then returned to Switzerland to play for SC YF Juventus and FC Stade Nyonnais. In summer 2016, he joined FC Dietikon.

He is the brother of Singapore international Precious Emuejeraye.

References

http://www.football.ch/sfl/876317/de/Kader.aspx?pId=583815

1983 births
Living people
Sportspeople from Lagos
Nigerian footballers
Nigerian expatriate footballers
Bridge F.C. players
Grasshopper Club Zürich players
SR Delémont players
FC Wohlen players
Swiss Super League players
Expatriate footballers in Switzerland
Gombak United FC players
Expatriate footballers in Singapore
Tianjin Jinmen Tiger F.C. players
Chinese Super League players
Expatriate footballers in China
Association football forwards
Nigerian expatriate sportspeople in China
FC Rapperswil-Jona players
21st-century Nigerian people